Cambell may refer to:

Cambell baronets in Essex:
 Sir John Cambell of Woodford, Bt. (died 1662)
 Cambell of Clay Hall (fl. 1664–1699)
 Sir Thomas Cambell, 1st Bt. (c. 1620–1665)
 Sir Thomas Cambell, 2nd Bt. (c. 1662–1668)
 Sir Henry Cambell, 3rd Bt. (1663–1699)

Other real people:
 Cambell Nalder (1937–1987), Australian politician
 Dennis Cambell (1907–2000), British naval officer
 Iain Cambell (fl. 1980s), British breaststroke swimmer, Great Britain at the 1984 Summer Olympics
 Sir Thomas Cambell, iron monger, Lord Mayor of London 1609–1610

Fictional characters:
 Cambell, family name in cartoon feature Mee-Shee: The Water Giant
 Cambell, character in epic poem The Faerie Queene, and example of allegory in Renaissance literature
 Randy Cambell, stuntman character in The Devil Dared Me To
 Cambell Chasen, character in TV series Significant Others (1998)

See also 
 Campbell (disambiguation)